'Samuelssonia is a monotypic genus of flowering plants belonging to the family Acanthaceae, it has only one known species, Samuelssonia verrucosa Urb. & Ekman 

It is native to Haiti.

The genus and the species were both circumscribed by Ignaz Urban and Eric Leonard Ekman in Arkiv Bot. vol.22A (8) on pages 96-97 in 1929.

The genus name of Samuelssonia'' is in honour of Gunnar Samuelsson (1885–1944), who was a Swedish botanist, from the Uppsala University where he was a curator of the Botanical Museum. Between 1924-1944, he was Professor and Director of the Riksmuseum in Stockholm.

References

Acanthaceae
Acanthaceae genera
Taxa named by Ignatz Urban
Taxa named by Erik Leonard Ekman
Flora of Haiti